The Association Générale des Etudiants Vietnamiens de Paris (AGEVP) was officially founded in 1964 to the growing needs of young Vietnamese students. Composed mostly of youth leaders, AGEVP pays special attention to sports and organizes numerous cultural events including the Festival of the Vietnamese New Year.

Primarily academic or friendly, the activities of the AGEVP have grown and diversified significantly over the years to make the association one of the flagship organizations of the Vietnamese community in Paris and in France.

See also 

 Overseas Vietnamese

External links 
 Official Website of the Association Générale des Etudiants Vietnamiens de Paris

Students' unions
Vietnamese diaspora in France
Vietnamese community organizations
Vietnamese students' associations
Overseas Vietnamese organizations
1964 establishments in France